Mestolobes mesacma is a moth of the family Crambidae described by Edward Meyrick in 1899. It is endemic to the Hawaiian islands of Molokai, Maui and Hawaii.

External links

Crambinae
Moths described in 1899
Taxa named by Edward Meyrick
Endemic moths of Hawaii